National Highway 744 or NH 744 (earlier NH 208) is a National Highway in Southern India that links Kollam (Quilon) in Kerala with Madurai in Tamil Nadu. Starting from NH 66 at Chinnakkada in Kollam, it joins Tirumangalam in Madurai at National Highway 44 (India).

Presenting the Union budget, Union Finance Minister, Nirmala Sitharaman, on Monday, announced the allocation of ₹1.03 lakh crore for upgradation of 3,500 km of highways in Tamil Nadu, including the Madurai kollam highway

Route description 
This route has historically connected the cashew and spice producing Kollam District with the erstwhile Madras State. Nowadays, hordes of lorries carrying various goods from Tamil Nadu ply through this highway. 
The road cuts through the narrow low altitude gap at Aryankavu, and is a visual delight, especially the stretch from Thenmala to Sengottai. The historic Kollam-Sengottai Railway line goes by the side of the road.

Chinnakada → Kallumthazham →Keralapuram → Kundara → Ezhukone → Kottarakkara → Melila → Kunnicode → Vilakkudy → Punalur → Edamon → Thenmala → Kazhuthurutty → Aryankavu → Shenkottai → Ilanji → Tenkasi → Kadayanallur → Puliangudi → Vasudevanallur → Sivagiri → Seithur → Rajapalayam → Srivilliputtur → Alagapuri → T. Kallupatti  → Tirumangalam

Future 
As per news reports and NHAI tender & project data, it has been confirmed that the section of NH 744 between Tirumangalam (on NH 44) and Rajapalayam is being taken up to be converted into a tolled, four lane highway for a total distance of 68 km.

Major intersections 
{| class="plainrowheaders wikitable"
|-
!scope=col|State
!scope=col|District
!scope=col|Location
!scope=col|km
!scope=col|mi
!scope=col|Destinations
!scope=col|Notes
|-
|rowspan="6"|Tamil Nadu
|rowspan="1"|Madurai
|Tirumangalam
|km= 
| - Madurai, Kanyakumari
| Eastern end of the highway.
|-
|rowspan="2"|Virudhunagar
| Alagapuri
|km= 
|  - Virudhunagar
| 
|-
| Srivilliputhur
|km= 
|  - Sivakasi
|-
|rowspan="3"|Thenkasi
| Puliyankudi
|km= 
|  - Sankarankoil
|
|-
| Thenkasi
|km= 
|  - Pavoorchatram, Courtallam
|-
| Sengottai
|km= 
|  -  Courtallam
|
|-
|rowspan="4"|Kerala
|rowspan="4"|Kollam
|Thenmala
|km= 
|  -  Thiruvananthapuram
| 
|-
|Punalur
|km= 
|  -  Anchal, Ayoor, Pathanapuram
|-
|Kottarakkara
|km= 
|  - Thiruvananthapuram, Kottayam, Angamaly
| 
|-
|Kollam
|km= 
|  - Thiruvananthapuram, Attingal, Ernakulam
| Western end of the highway. Kollam bypass.
|-

Gallery

See also 
 List of National Highways in India (by Highway Number)
 List of National Highways in India
 National Highways Development Project

References 

744
744
National highways in India
Roads in Kollam district